Bassarona recta, the redtail marquis, is a species of nymphalid butterfly found in South and South-East Asia.

Range
It is found in Assam, Myanmar, Thailand, Cambodia, Peninsular Malaysia and Langkawi.

Subspecies
Bassarona recta recta (Assam to Burma and possibly Thailand)
Bassarona recta monilis Moore, [1897] (central Thailand, Peninsular Malaya, Langkawi)

References

Bassarona
Butterflies of Asia
Butterflies described in 1886